In the United States Congress, a Statement of Managers must accompany a conference report on legislation as negotiated by the House and the Senate.

References

Legislative branch of the United States government